Derxia lacustris  is a Gram-negative, nitrogen-fixing, aerobic, motile bacterium of the genus Derxia, isolated from a freshwater lake in Taiwan.

References

External links
Type strain of Derxia lacustris at BacDive -  the Bacterial Diversity Metadatabase

Burkholderiales
Bacteria described in 2013